Pardi is one of the 182 Legislative Assembly constituencies of Gujarat state in India. It is part of Valsad district.

List of segments
This assembly seat represents the following segments,

 Pardi Taluka (Part) Villages – Umarsadi, Balda, Kumbhariya, Sondhalwada, Parvasa, Kachwal, Mota Waghchhipa, Nana Waghchhipa, Sukhesh, Borlai, Sukhlav, Velparva, Khadki, Motiwada, Palsana, Kalsar, Udwada, Kolak, Kikarla, Rentlav, Dungri, Dashwada, Amli, Khuntej, Sarodhi, Orvad, Saran, Tarakpardi, Vatar, Kunta, Morai, Bagwada, Tighara, Paria, Tukwada, Balitha, Salvav, Chharwada, Namdha, Chandor, Chhiri, Karvad, Pardi (M), Chala (CT), Vapi (M), Vapi (INA)

Members of Legislative Assembly
2002 - Laxmanbhai Patel, Indian National Congress
2007 - Ushaben Patel, Bharatiya Janata Party
2012 - Kanubhai Desai, Bharatiya Janata Party
2017 - Kanubhai Desai, Bharatiya Janta Party

Election results

2022

2017

2012

2007

2002

See also
 List of constituencies of Gujarat Legislative Assembly
 Gujarat Legislative Assembly

References

External links
 

Assembly constituencies of Gujarat
Valsad district